Kazanci is a village in the municipality of Gacko, Republika Srpska, Bosnia and Herzegovina.

See also 
 Tešan Podrugović

References

Villages in Republika Srpska
Populated places in Gacko